The Hamburg culture or Hamburgian (15,500-13,100 BP) was a Late Upper Paleolithic culture of reindeer hunters in northwestern Europe during the last part of the Weichsel Glaciation beginning during the Bölling interstadial. Sites are found close to the ice caps of the time. They extend as far north as the Pomeranian ice margin.

The Hamburg Culture has been identified at many places, for example, the settlement at Meiendorf and Ahrensburg north of Hamburg, Germany. It is characterized by shouldered points and zinken tools, which were used as chisels when working with antler. In later periods tanged Havelte-type points appear, sometimes described as most of all a northwestern phenomenon. Notwithstanding the spread over a large geographical area in which a homogeneous development is not to be expected, the definition of the Hamburgian as a technological complex of its own has not recently been questioned.

The culture spread from northern France to southern Scandinavia in the north and to Poland in the east. In Britain a related culture is called Creswellian.

In the early 1980s, the first find from the culture in Scandinavia was excavated at Jels in Southern Jutland. Recently, new finds have been discovered at, for example, Finja in northern Skåne. The latest findings (2005) have shown that these people travelled far north along the Norwegian coast dryshod during the summer, since the sea level was  lower than today.

In northern Germany, camps with layers of detritus have been found. In the layers there is a great deal of horn and bone, and it appears that the reindeer was an important prey.

The distribution of the finds in the settlements show that the settlements were small and only inhabited by a small group of people. At a few settlements, archaeologists have discovered circles of stones, interpreted as weights for a teepee covering.

See also
 Federmesser culture
 Alfred Rust
 Creswellian
 Ahrensburg culture
 Nationalencyklopedin

References 

Paleolithic cultures of Europe
Upper Paleolithic cultures of Europe
Archaeological cultures of Central Europe
Archaeological cultures of Northern Europe
Archaeological cultures of Western Europe
Archaeological cultures in Belgium
Archaeological cultures in Denmark
Archaeological cultures in France
Archaeological cultures in Germany
Archaeological cultures in the Netherlands
Archaeological cultures in Norway
Archaeological cultures in Poland
Archaeological cultures in Sweden
History of Hamburg